Bogdan Stanisław Daras (born 27 April 1960) is a Polish wrestler. He competed in the men's Greco-Roman 82 kg at the 1988 Summer Olympics.

References

1960 births
Living people
Polish male sport wrestlers
Olympic wrestlers of Poland
Wrestlers at the 1988 Summer Olympics
Sportspeople from Piotrków Trybunalski